Alternative press may refer to:

Individual publications
 Alternative Press (magazine), an American music magazine

Alternative journalism
 Alternative media
 Alternative media (U.S. political left)
 Alternative media (U.S. political right)
 Alternative media in the United Kingdom
 Alternative newspaper
 List of alternative weekly newspapers
 Independent media
 Radical media
 Underground press

Journalistic trade associations
 Association of Alternative Newsmedia, a national Michigan based trade association of weekly newspapers
 The Alternative Press (TAPinto), a network of more than 80 franchised online local news sites in New Jersey, New York, Pennsylvania and Florida